Sara Liu Xijun, is a Chinese pop singer who rose to fame through televised singing competitions. Born 30 April 1988 in Shenzhen, Guangdong, she began as a singer by ranking fifth in the fourth season (2009) of a singing contest in China, Super Girls, or Happy Girl.

Career life
 In 2009, Liu Xijun decided to take part in the famous Hunan TV show Super Girl, but she failed to rank with the Hunan TV Super Girl nationwide top 3. Her musical experience is listed below.
 Personal experience:
 In 2003, Liu Xijun started to show her shining talent: she was awarded as a top 10 school singer in a Shenzhen shatoujiao school singing competition.
 In February 2004, when the little Xijun was only fifteen years old, she won the championship of a local famous singing competition, which was hosted by Shenzhen Aoqi Music Inc, and then was signed by this music company.

Super Girl

 In March 2009, she attended a TV show hosted by Zhejiang TV, representing Shenzhen City. Liu Xijun joined the Super Girl 2009 competition. Her goal was to be in the top 20 in Guangdong Province and top 300 nationwide. She became one of the top 60 nationwide on June 13, 2009. With her outstanding talent, she later ranked with the top 20 nationwide.
 On June 26, 2009, Liu Xijun beat Zeng Yike by just one vote at Super Girl national competition and became the third Super Girl top 10 competitor.
 On July 17, 2009, she competed with Yu Kewei to be the cover girl for the fashion magazine Elle.
 On July 24, 2009, Liu Xijun was ranked fourth in Round 2 of the Super Girl National final competition.
 On August 1, 2009, she was voted fourth in Round 3 of the Super Girl National final competition; advancing past Tan Lina to become one of the nationwide top 7.
 On August 8, 2009, Liu Xijun sang "Sky", and moved all the judges and brought them to their feet; however, she failed to become Elle cover girl that week.
 On August 15, 2009, she beat Tan Lina in the final PK and became one of the top 5 finalists at Super Girl.
 On August 22, 2009, Liu Xijun together with Yu Haomin, sang the classical song "Embrace" and high acclaim from the judges and the audience.
Unfortunately, Liu Xijun lost her challenge to Yu Kewei with her song "I Only Care for You".

Musical style
Liu Xijun has high personal music recognition accuracy in terms of her voice, therefore, people can easily distinguish her voice by listening to her songs. Liu Xijun's musical style could be categorized as classical pop music, such as Deng Lijun, she owned nearly all the characters which Chinese traditional singers have had. Even though her songs still have her own features, taking "Love Garden" for instance, this song is standard pop music, depicting a tale of a girl's first love. Having experienced Super Girl 2009 as her precious fortune, Liu Xijun improved her singing skills greatly when she signed with EEMEDIA after Super Girl, and started her new music career.

Discography

Albums and EPs (extended plays)

Singles
 The Highest of All February 27, 2010
 The Rhododendron Flower Blooms Again August 12, 2010

Promotional songs

References

External links
 Sara Liu's blog
 HunanTV Super Girl page for Sara Liu

1988 births
Living people
Xinghai Conservatory of Music alumni
People from Shenzhen
Singers from Shenzhen
People from Meixian District
Hakka people
Super Girl contestants
Musicians from Guangdong
Hakka musicians